Greg Alexander James Stewart (born 17 March 1990) is a Scottish professional footballer who plays as a forward or attacking midfielder for Indian Super League club Mumbai City.

He has previously played for Scottish clubs Cowdenbeath, Dundee, Aberdeen, Kilmarnock and Rangers, as well as for Birmingham City of the EFL Championship and Jamshedpur of the Indian Super League.

Club career

Early career
Stewart started his footballing career at Rangers' Academy and played there until he was 13. He then played in the Hearts youth system, but was released due to his height. He then trained with Falkirk and Stirling Albion for almost a year, before joining Syngenta Amateurs in 2007.

Cowdenbeath
In July 2010, Stewart signed with Cowdenbeath of the Scottish First Division. He made his league debut on 7 August, in a 2–0 home loss against Ross County. On 6 November, he scored his first professional goal. He finished the season as the club's top scorer with nine goals.

Dundee
On 7 April 2014, it was confirmed that Stewart had signed a pre-contract agreement with Dundee and would join the club upon the expiry of his Cowdenbeath contract. He scored on his debut as Dundee beat Peterhead 4–0 in the first round of the Scottish League Cup on 2 August 2014. In January 2015, he signed a new contract until 2017. Stewart was named as SPFL Player of the Month for January 2015, after scoring five goals in seven matches during the month. He was named as one of four players on the shortlist for the 2014–15 PFA Scotland Players' Player of the Year award, and was nominated for a second consecutive season in April 2016.

Having rejected an extension, Stewart began the last year of his Dundee contract with six goals in three League Cup matches, amid rumours linking him with a move to other SPFL clubs or to the English Championship.

Birmingham City
On 12 August 2016, Stewart signed a three-year contract with Birmingham City; the fee was officially undisclosed, but reported by the Dundee Evening Telegraph as an initial £500,000, potentially rising to more than £1 million. Stewart made his debut as a late substitute in a 1–1 draw with Wigan Athletic on 16 August, and continued off the bench until making what the Birmingham Mail dubbed a deserved first start in an unusually attacking lineup at home to Preston North End. His team came back from 2–0 down to draw, and Stewart's own performance was ineffective. He had a run of four starts in December, after Gianfranco Zola had replaced Gary Rowett as manager, but ended the season as a fringe player, with 21 league appearances, of which 6 were in the starting eleven, without scoring.

Loans
On 27 June 2017, Stewart signed for Aberdeen of the Scottish Premiership on loan for the 2017–18 season. He made 34 appearances and scored three goals in all competitions for the club. Stewart was loaned to Kilmarnock, also of the Scottish Premiership, in August 2018. He scored on his debut after "a run from half way that ended with an exquisite chip over the goalkeeper" to clinch a 2–0 win away to his former club Aberdeen, and scored again in his second match, albeit in a losing cause away to Hibernian. Stewart scored eight goals in 16 appearances for Kilmarnock in the first part of the 2018–19 season, which helped them into third place in the league.

Birmingham City opted to recall Stewart from his loan to Kilmarnock in January 2019, and then loaned him to Aberdeen again, until the end of the season. He ended the season with two goals from 20 appearances in all competitions (one from 15 in the league).

Rangers
On 13 June 2019, Rangers announced that Stewart had joined the Scottish Premiership club on a two-year contract. Stewart was a free agent with his contract at Birmingham City allowed to expire. He made his competitive debut for Rangers on 9 July 2019 in a 4–0 win over St Joseph's of Gibraltar in the first leg of the first qualifying round of the 2019–20 UEFA Europa League.

After he won the Scottish Premiership title with the club, Rangers officially announced Stewart's departure in June 2021 and thanked him for his contributions.

Jamshedpur
On 12 September 2021, Indian Super League club Jamshedpur announced that Stewart had joined the team on a one-year deal.

On 14 December, Stewart scored a hat-trick against Odisha FC in their 4–0 win. Later on 26 December, he scored a "stunning" long-range, bending free kick in a 1–1 draw against Kerala Blasters. He finished the season with ten goals and ten assists, and was named Indian Super League Hero of the League for 2021–22.

Mumbai City
In July 2022, Indian Super League club Mumbai City announced the arrival of Stewart on a two-year deal. On 18 August, he scored a penalty on his debut for the club against Indian Navy in the Durand Cup, which ended in a 4–1 win. Stewart scored a hat-trick in the Durand Cup quarter-finals against Chennaiyin.

Career statistics

Honours

Rangers
Scottish Premiership: 2020–21

Jamshedpur
 ISL League Winners Shield: 2021–22

Mumbai City
 ISL League Winners Shield : 2022–23
 Durand Cup runner-up: 2022

Individual
Indian Super League Hero of the League: 2021–22
Indian Super League Hero of the Month: December 2021, February 2022
Durand Cup Golden Ball: 2022

References

1990 births
Living people
Footballers from Stirling
Scottish footballers
Association football forwards
Cowdenbeath F.C. players
Dundee F.C. players
Birmingham City F.C. players
Aberdeen F.C. players
Kilmarnock F.C. players
Rangers F.C. players
Jamshedpur FC players
Mumbai City FC players
Scottish Football League players
Scottish Professional Football League players
English Football League players
Indian Super League players